Le Noirmont is a mountain of the Jura, located north of Saint-Cergue in the canton of Vaud. At 1,567 metres, it is the highest mountain between the Col de la Givrine and Mont Tendre. Although Le Noirmont is wholly in Switzerland, the border with France runs on the western base of the mountain.

The closest localities are La Cure and Les Rousses.

References

External links

Le Noirmont on Hikr

Mountains of the Jura
Mountains of the canton of Vaud
Mountains of Switzerland
One-thousanders of Switzerland